Aleksandr Shtepa (born April 15, 1979) is a retired male decathlete from Russia. He set his personal best score (8007 points) at a meet in Krasnodar on May 24, 2002. Shtepa also competed in discus throw.

Achievements

External links 

1979 births
Living people
Russian decathletes
Russian male discus throwers
Place of birth missing (living people)